Scolioplecta allocotus is a species of moth of the family Tortricidae. It is found in Queensland, Australia.

References

Moths described in 1965
Phricanthini